August Weekend or August Week End or Week-End Madness is a 1936 American drama film directed by Charles Lamont and starring Valerie Hobson, Paul Harvey and G. P. Huntley. The screenplay was adapted by Paul Perez from a story by Faith Baldwin. It was produced by Chesterfield Motion Pictures and distributed by Grand National Distributors.

Cast
 Valerie Hobson as Claire Barry  
 Paul Harvey as George Washburne  
 G. P. Huntley as Kim Sherwood  
 Betty Compson as Ethel Ames  
 Frank Melton as Ronnie Washburne
 Edgar Norton as Grimsby 
 Gigi Parrish as Elinor  
 Maynard Holmes as Dave Maxwell  
 Claire McDowell as Alma Washburne  
 Howard C. Hickman as Spencer  
 Paul West as Taxi Driver 
 Phyllis Crane as Receptionist at switchboard 
 Jack Gardner as Tom, secretary of Northern Country Club 
 Paul Irving as Max Stanfield  
 Dorothea Kent as Midge Washburne

References

External links
 
 
 
 
 

1936 films
1936 drama films
American drama films
Films directed by Charles Lamont
American black-and-white films
Chesterfield Pictures films
1930s English-language films
1930s American films